The president of Sri Lanka is the elected head of state and the chief executive. The president is a dominant political figure in Sri Lanka. The office was created in 1972, as more of a ceremonial position. It was empowered with executive powers by the 1978 Constitution introduced by J. R. Jayewardene.

Presidents
Parties

Timeline

See also
 Presidential Secretariat
 List of prime ministers of Sri Lanka

Notes

References

External links
General

 
 

List
Sri Lanka, Presidents
Presidents